

Station list

Z